is a railway station in the city of Utsunomiya, Tochigi, Japan, operated by the East Japan Railway Company (JR East).

Lines

Station layout
This station has two island platforms connected to the station building by a footbridge; however, only one side of each platform is in use. The station is staffed.

Platforms

History
Okamoto Station opened on 25 February 1897. With the privatization of JNR on 1 April 1987, the station came under the control of JR East.

Passenger statistics
In fiscal 2019, the station was used by an average of 2704 passengers daily (boarding passengers only).

Surrounding area
 
 Hirade Industrial Park

See also
 List of railway stations in Japan

References

External links

  JR East station information 

Railway stations in Tochigi Prefecture
Tōhoku Main Line
Utsunomiya Line
Karasuyama Line
Railway stations in Japan opened in 1897
Utsunomiya
Stations of East Japan Railway Company